Panthea apanthea is a moth of the family Noctuidae. The species is found in three areas of the south-western United States, Coconino County and Apache County (White Mountains) in Arizona, and El Paso County in east-central Colorado.

The wingspan is about 30 mm for males and about 36 mm for females. Adults are on wing in early August.

External links
Revision of the New World Panthea Hübner (Lepidoptera, Noctuidae) with descriptions of 5 new species and 2 new subspecies
Image

Pantheinae
Moths described in 2009